Chiroqchi (Чироқчи) is a district in the north-east of Qashqadaryo Region in Uzbekistan. The administrative center of the district is the city of Chiroqchi. The district consists of one city (Chiroqchi), 8 urban-type settlements (Jar, Oʻymovut, Dam, Pakandi, Paxtaobod, Chiyal, Koʻkdala, Ayritom) and 20 rural communities.

There is a Polish war cemetery for World War II soldiers in Chiroqchi.

References

Districts of Uzbekistan